Marmora is a comune (municipality) in the Province of Cuneo in the Italian region Piedmont, located about  southwest of Turin and about  west of Cuneo.

The municipality of Marmora contains the frazioni (subdivisions, mainly villages and hamlets) Tolosano, Torello, Garino, Urzio, Arvaglia, Arata, Reinero, Finello, S. Sebastiano, and Vernetti.

Marmora borders the following municipalities: Canosio, Castelmagno, Celle di Macra, Demonte, Macra, Prazzo, Sambuco, and Stroppo.

Demographic evolution

See also 
 Punta Tempesta

References

External links

Cities and towns in Piedmont